The Marx Brothers were an American family comedy act that was successful in vaudeville, on Broadway, and in motion pictures from 1905 to 1949. Five of the Marx Brothers' thirteen feature films were selected by the American Film Institute (AFI) as among the top 100 comedy films, with two of them, Duck Soup (1933) and A Night at the Opera (1935), in the top fifteen. They are widely considered by critics, scholars and fans to be among the greatest and most influential comedians of the 20th century. The brothers were included in AFI's 100 Years... 100 Stars list of the 25 greatest male stars of Classical Hollywood cinema, the only performers to be included collectively.

The brothers are almost universally known by their stage names: Chico, Harpo, Groucho, Gummo, and Zeppo. There was a sixth brother, the firstborn, named Manfred (Mannie), who died in infancy; Zeppo was given the middle name Manfred in his memory.

The core of the act was the three elder brothers: Chico, Harpo, and Groucho, each of whom developed a highly distinctive stage persona. After the group essentially disbanded in 1950, Groucho went on to a successful second career in television, while Harpo and Chico appeared less prominently. The two younger brothers, Gummo and Zeppo, never developed their stage characters to the same extent as the elder three. Both left the act to pursue business careers at which they were successful, and for a time ran a large theatrical agency through which they represented their brothers and others. Gummo was not in any of the movies; Zeppo appeared in the first five films in relatively straight (non-comedic) roles. The early performing lives of the brothers owed much to their mother, Minnie Marx (the sister of vaudeville comic Al Shean), who acted as their manager until her death in 1929.

Family background and early life

The Marx Brothers were born in New York City, the sons of Jewish immigrants from Germany and France. Their mother Miene "Minnie" Schoenberg (professionally known as Minnie Palmer, later the brothers' manager) was from Dornum in East Frisia. She came from a family of performers. Her mother was a yodeling harpist and her father a ventriloquist; both were funfair entertainers. Around 1880, the family emigrated to New York City, where Minnie married Sam Marx in 1884.

Samuel ("Sam"; born Simon) Marx was a native of Mertzwiller, a small Alsatian village, and worked as a tailor. His name was changed to Samuel Marx, and he was nicknamed "Frenchy". The family lived in the New York City's Upper East Side in the Yorkville, Manhattan district centered in the Irish, German and Italian quarters.

The Marx Brothers also had an older 'sister'—actually a cousin, born in January 1885—who had been adopted by Minnie and Frenchie. Her name was Pauline, or "Polly".

Leonard Joseph "Chico" Marx is the eldest of the brothers, born in 1887. Adolph "Harpo" Marx was born in 1888, Julius Henry "Groucho" Marx in 1890, Milton "Gummo" Marx in 1892, and the youngest Herbert Manfred "Zeppo" Marx in 1901.

Family lore told privately of the firstborn son, Manny, born in 1886 but surviving for only three months, and dying of tuberculosis. Some members of the Marx family wondered whether he was real, but Manfred's death certificate from the Borough of Manhattan reveals that he died, aged seven months, on 17 July 1886, of enterocolitis, with "asthenia" contributing, i.e., probably a victim of influenza. He is buried in Washington Cemetery (Brooklyn, NY), beside his grandmother, Fanny Sophie Schönberg (née Salomons), who died on 10 April 1901.

During the early 20th century, Minnie helped her younger brother Abraham Elieser Adolf Schönberg (stage name Al Shean) to enter show business; he became highly successful in vaudeville and on Broadway as half of the musical comedy double act Gallagher and Shean, and this gave the brothers an entrée to musical comedy, vaudeville and Broadway at Minnie's instigation. Minnie also acted as the brothers' manager, using the name Minnie Palmer so that agents did not realize that she was also their mother. All the brothers confirmed that Minnie Marx had been the head of the family and the driving force in getting the troupe launched, the only person who could keep them in order; she was said to be a hard bargainer with theatre management.

As the comedy act developed, it increasingly focused on the stage characters created by the elder brothers Chico, Harpo, and Groucho, leaving little room for the younger brothers.  Gummo and Zeppo both became successful businessmen: Gummo left the act early and gained success through his talent agency activities and a raincoat business,  Zeppo stayed with the act through its Broadway years and the beginnings of its film career, but then quit and later became a multi-millionaire through his engineering business.

Stage beginnings

The brothers were from a family of artists, and their musical talent was encouraged from an early age. Harpo was particularly talented, learning to play an estimated six different instruments throughout his career. He became a dedicated harpist, which gave him his nickname. Chico was an excellent pianist, Groucho a guitarist and singer, and Zeppo a vocalist.

They got their start in vaudeville, where their uncle Albert Schönberg performed as Al Shean of Gallagher and Shean. Groucho's debut was in 1905, mainly as a singer. By 1907, he and Gummo were singing together as "The Three Nightingales" with Mabel O'Donnell. The next year, Harpo became the fourth Nightingale and by 1910, the group briefly expanded to include their mother Minnie and their Aunt Hannah. The troupe was renamed "The Six Mascots".

Comedy
One evening in 1912, a performance at the Opera House in Nacogdoches, Texas, was interrupted by shouts from outside about a runaway mule. The audience hurried out to see what was happening. Groucho was angered by the interruption and, when the audience returned, he made snide comments at their expense, including "Nacogdoches is full of roaches" and "the jackass is the flower of Tex-ass". Instead of becoming angry, the audience laughed. The family then realized that it had potential as a comic troupe. (However, in his autobiography Harpo Speaks, Harpo Marx stated that the runaway mule incident occurred in Ada, Oklahoma. A 1930 article in the San Antonio Express newspaper stated that the incident took place in Marshall, Texas.)

The act slowly evolved from singing with comedy to comedy with music. The brothers' sketch "Fun in Hi Skule" featured Groucho as a German-accented teacher presiding over a classroom that included students Harpo, Gummo, and Chico. The last version of the school act was titled Home Again and was written by their uncle Al Shean. The Home Again tour reached Flint, Michigan, in 1915, where 14-year-old Zeppo joined his four brothers for what is believed to be the only time that all five Marx Brothers appeared together on stage. Gummo then left to serve in World War I, reasoning that "anything is better than being an actor!" Zeppo replaced him in their final vaudeville years and in the jump to Broadway, and then to Paramount films.

During World War I, anti-German sentiments were common, and the family tried to conceal its German origin. Mother Minnie learned that farmers were excluded from the draft rolls, so she purchased a  poultry farm near Countryside, Illinois—but the brothers soon found that chicken ranching was not in their blood. During this time, Groucho discontinued his "German" stage personality.

By this time, "The Four Marx Brothers" had begun to incorporate their unique style of comedy into their act and to develop their characters. Both Groucho's and Harpo's memoirs say that their now-famous on-stage personae were created by Al Shean. Groucho began to wear his trademark greasepaint mustache and to use a stooped walk. Harpo stopped speaking onstage and began to wear a red fright wig and carry a taxi-cab horn. Chico spoke with a fake Italian accent, developed off-stage to deal with neighborhood toughs, while Zeppo adopted the role of the romantic (and "peerlessly cheesy", according to James Agee) straight man.

The on-stage personalities of Groucho, Chico, and Harpo were said to have been based on their actual traits. Zeppo, on the other hand, was considered the funniest brother offstage, despite his straight stage roles. He was the youngest and had grown up watching his brothers, so he could fill in for and imitate any of the others when illness kept them from performing. "He was so good as Captain Spaulding [in Animal Crackers] that I would have let him play the part indefinitely, if they had allowed me to smoke in the audience," Groucho recalled. (Zeppo stood in for Groucho in the film version of Animal Crackers. Groucho was unavailable to film the scene in which the Beaugard painting is stolen, so the script was contrived to include a power failure, which allowed Zeppo to play the Spaulding part in near-darkness.) In December 1917, the Marx brothers were noted in an advertisement playing in a musical comedy act "Home Again".

By the 1920s, the Marx Brothers had become one of America's favorite theatrical acts, with their sharp and bizarre sense of humor. They satirized high society and human hypocrisy, and they became famous for their improvisational comedy in free-form scenarios. A famous early instance was when Harpo arranged to chase a fleeing chorus girl across the stage during the middle of a Groucho monologue, to see if Groucho would be thrown off. However, to the audience's delight, Groucho merely reacted by commenting, "First time I ever saw a taxi hail a passenger.” When Harpo chased the girl back in the other direction, Groucho calmly checked his watch and ad-libbed, "The 9:20's right on time. You can set your watch by the Lehigh Valley."

The brothers' vaudeville act had made them stars on Broadway under Chico's management and with Groucho's creative direction, with the musical revue I'll Say She Is (1924–1925). Its success helped secure playwright George S. Kaufman, and songwriter Irving Berlin, (Two of Broadway’s best talents) for the musical comedy, The Cocoanuts (1925–1926) and later Animal Crackers (1928–1929).

Out of their distinctive costumes, the brothers looked alike, even down to their receding hairlines. Zeppo could pass for a younger Groucho, and played the role of his son in Horse Feathers. A scene in Duck Soup finds Groucho, Harpo, and Chico all appearing in the famous greasepaint eyebrows, mustache, and round glasses while wearing nightcaps. The three are indistinguishable, enabling them to carry off the "mirror scene" perfectly.

Origin of the stage names
The stage names of the brothers (except Zeppo) were coined by monologist Art Fisher during a poker game in Galesburg, Illinois, based both on the brothers' personalities and Gus Mager's Sherlocko the Monk, a popular comic strip of the day that included a supporting character named "Groucho". As Fisher dealt each brother a card, he addressed them, for the very first time, by the names they kept for the rest of their lives.

The reasons behind Chico's and Harpo's stage names are undisputed, and Gummo's is fairly well established. Groucho's and Zeppo's are far less clear. Arthur was named Harpo because he played the harp, and Leonard became Chico (pronounced "Chick-o") because he was, in the slang of the period, a "chicken-chaser". ("Chickens"—later "chicks"—was period slang for women. "In England now," said Groucho, "they were called 'birds'.")

In his autobiography, Harpo explained that Milton became Gummo because he crept about the theater like a gumshoe detective. Other sources reported that Gummo was the family's hypochondriac, having been the sickliest of the brothers in childhood, and therefore wore rubber overshoes, called gumshoes, in all kinds of weather. Still others reported that Milton was the troupe's best dancer, and dance shoes tended to have rubber soles. Groucho stated that the source of the name was Gummo wearing galoshes. Whatever the details, the name relates to rubber-soled shoes.

The reason that Julius was named Groucho is perhaps the most disputed. There are three explanations:
 Julius' temperament: Maxine, Chico's daughter and Groucho's niece, said in the documentary The Unknown Marx Brothers that Julius was named "Groucho" simply because he was grouchy most or all of the time. Robert B. Weide, a director known for his knowledge of Marx Brothers history, said in Remarks On Marx (a documentary short included with the DVD of A Night at the Opera) that, among the competing explanations, he found this one to be the most believable. Steve Allen said in Funny People that the name made no sense; Groucho might have been impudent and impertinent, but not grouchy—at least not around Allen. However, at the very end of his life, Groucho finally admitted that Fisher had named him Groucho because he was the "moody one".
 The grouch bag: This explanation appears in Harpo's biography; it was voiced by Chico in a TV appearance included on The Unknown Marx Brothers; and it was offered by George Fenneman, Groucho's sidekick on his TV game show You Bet Your Life. A grouch bag was a small drawstring bag worn around the neck in which a traveler could keep money and other valuables so that it would be very difficult for anyone to steal them. Most of Groucho's friends and associates stated that Groucho was extremely stingy, especially after losing all his money in the 1929 stock market crash, so naming him for the grouch bag may have been a comment on this trait. Groucho insisted that this was not the case in chapter six of his first autobiography:

I kept my money in a 'grouch bag'. This was a small chamois bag that actors used to wear around their neck to keep other hungry actors from pinching their dough. Naturally, you're going to think that's where I got my name from. But that's not so. Grouch bags were worn on manly chests long before there was a Groucho.
 Groucho's explanation: Groucho himself insisted that he was named for a character in the comic strip Knocko the Monk, which inspired the craze for nicknames ending in "o"; in fact, there was a character in that strip named "Groucho". However, he is the only Marx or Marx associate who defended this theory and, as he is not an unbiased witness, few biographers take the claim seriously.

Groucho himself was no help on this point; he was discussing the Brothers' names during his Carnegie Hall concert, and he said of his own, "My name, of course, I never did understand." He goes on to mention the possibility that he was named after his unemployed uncle Julius, who lived with his family. The family believed that he was a rich uncle hiding a fortune, and Groucho claimed that he may have been named after him by the family trying to get into the will. "And he finally died, and he left us his will, and in that will he left three razor blades, an 8-ball, a celluloid dicky, and he owed my father $85 beside."

Herbert was not nicknamed by Art Fisher, since he did not join the act until Gummo had departed. As with Groucho, three explanations exist for Herbert's name "Zeppo":
 Harpo's explanation: Harpo said in Harpo Speaks! that the brothers had named Herbert for Mr. Zippo, a chimpanzee that was part of another performer's act. Herbert found the nickname very unflattering, and when it came time for him to join the act, he put his foot down and refused to be called "Zippo". The brothers compromised on "Zeppo".
 Chico's explanation: Chico never wrote an autobiography and gave fewer interviews than his brothers, but his daughter Maxine said in The Unknown Marx Brothers that, when the brothers lived in Chicago, a popular style of humor was the "Zeke and Zeb" joke, which made fun of slow-witted Midwesterners in much the same way that Boudreaux and Thibodeaux jokes mock Cajuns and Ole and Lena jokes mock Minnesotans. One day, Chico returned home to find Herbert sitting on the fence. Herbert greeted him by saying "Hi, Zeke!" Chico responded with "Hi, Zeb!" and the name stuck. The brothers thereafter called him "Zeb" and, when he joined the act, they floated the idea of "Zebbo", eventually preferring "Zeppo".
 Groucho's explanation: In a tape-recorded interview excerpted on The Unknown Marx Brothers, Groucho said that Zeppo was so named because he was born when the first zeppelins started crossing the ocean. He stated this in his Carnegie Hall concert, around 1972. The first zeppelin flew in July 1900, and Herbert was born seven months later in February 1901. However, the first transatlantic zeppelin flight was not until 1924, long after Herbert's birth.

Maxine Marx reported in The Unknown Marx Brothers that the brothers listed their real names (Julius, Leonard, Adolph, Milton, and Herbert) on playbills and in programs, and only used the nicknames behind the scenes, until Alexander Woollcott overheard them calling one another by the nicknames. He asked them why they used their real names publicly when they had such wonderful nicknames, and they replied, "That wouldn't be dignified." Woollcott answered with a belly laugh. Woollcott did not meet the Marx Brothers until the premiere of I'll Say She Is, which was their first Broadway show, so this would mean that they used their real names throughout their vaudeville days, and that the name "Gummo" never appeared in print during his time in the act. Other sources reported that the Marx Brothers went by their nicknames during their vaudeville era, but briefly listed themselves by their given names when I'll Say She Is opened because they were worried that a Broadway audience would reject a vaudeville act if they were perceived as low class.

Motion pictures

Paramount

The Marx Brothers' stage shows became popular just as motion pictures were evolving to "talkies". They signed a contract with Paramount Pictures and embarked on their film career at Paramount's studios in New York City's Astoria section. Their first two released films (after an unreleased short silent film titled Humor Risk) were adaptations of the Broadway shows The Cocoanuts (1929) and Animal Crackers (1930). Both were written by George S. Kaufman and Morrie Ryskind.

Production then shifted to Hollywood, beginning with a short film that was included in Paramount's twentieth anniversary documentary, The House That Shadows Built (1931), in which they adapted a scene from I'll Say She Is. Their third feature-length film, Monkey Business (1931), was their first movie not based on a stage production.

Horse Feathers (1932), in which the brothers satirized the American college system and Prohibition, was their most popular film yet, and won them the cover of Time magazine. It included a running gag from their stage work, in which Harpo produces a ludicrous array of props from inside his coat, including a wooden mallet, a fish, a coiled rope, a tie, a poster of a woman in her underwear, a cup of hot coffee, a sword and (just after Groucho warns him that he "can't burn the candle at both ends") a candle burning at both ends.

During this period Chico and Groucho starred in a radio comedy series, Flywheel, Shyster and Flywheel. Though the series was short lived, much of the material developed for it was used in subsequent films. The show's scripts and recordings were believed lost until copies of the scripts were found in the Library of Congress in the 1980s. After publication in a book they were performed with Marx Brothers' impersonators for BBC Radio.

Their last Paramount film, Duck Soup (1933), directed by the highly regarded Leo McCarey, is the highest rated of the five Marx Brothers films on the American Film Institute's "100 years ... 100 Movies" list. It did not do as well financially as Horse Feathers, but was the sixth-highest grosser of 1933. The film sparked a dispute between the Marxes and the village of Fredonia, New York. "Freedonia" was the name of a fictional country in the script, and the city fathers wrote to Paramount and asked the studio to remove all references to Freedonia because "it is hurting our town's image". Groucho fired back a sarcastic retort asking them to change the name of their town, because "it's hurting our picture".

MGM, RKO, and United Artists

On 11 March 1933, the Marx Brothers founded a production company, the "International Amalgamated Consolidated Affiliated World Wide Film Productions Company Incorporated, of North Dakota".

After expiration of the Paramount contract Zeppo left the act to become an agent. He and brother Gummo went on to build one of the biggest talent agencies in Hollywood, working with the likes of Jack Benny and Lana Turner. Groucho and Chico did radio, and there was talk of returning to Broadway. At a bridge game with Chico, Irving Thalberg began discussing the possibility of the Marxes joining Metro-Goldwyn-Mayer. They signed, now billed as "Groucho, Chico, Harpo, Marx Bros."

Unlike the free-for-all scripts at Paramount, Thalberg insisted on a strong story structure that made the brothers more sympathetic characters, interweaving their comedy with romantic plots and non-comic musical numbers, and targeting their mischief-making at obvious villains. Thalberg was adamant that scripts include a "low point", where all seems lost for both the Marxes and the romantic leads. He instituted the innovation of testing the film's script before live audiences before filming began, to perfect the comic timing, and to retain jokes that earned laughs and replace those that did not. Thalberg restored Harpo's harp solos and Chico's piano solos, which had been omitted from Duck Soup.

The first Marx Brothers/Thalberg film was A Night at the Opera (1935), a satire on the world of opera, where the brothers help two young singers in love by throwing a production of Il Trovatore into chaos. The film—including its famous scene where an absurd number of people crowd into a tiny stateroom on a ship—was a great success, and was followed two years later by an even bigger hit, A Day at the Races (1937), in which the brothers cause mayhem in a sanitarium and at a horse race. The film features Groucho and Chico's famous "Tootsie Frootsie Ice Cream" sketch. In a 1969 interview with Dick Cavett, Groucho said that the two movies made with Thalberg were the best that they ever produced. Despite the Thalberg films' success, the brothers left MGM in 1937; Thalberg had died suddenly on September 14, 1936, two weeks after filming began on A Day at the Races, leaving the Marxes without an advocate at the studio.

After a short experience at RKO (Room Service, 1938), the Marx Brothers returned to MGM and made three more films: At the Circus (1939), Go West (1940) and The Big Store (1941). Prior to the release of The Big Store the team announced they were retiring from the screen. Four years later, however, Chico persuaded his brothers to make two additional films, A Night in Casablanca (1946) and Love Happy (1949), to alleviate his severe gambling debts. Both pictures were released by United Artists.

Later years
From the 1940s onward Chico and Harpo appeared separately and together in nightclubs and casinos. Chico fronted a big band, the Chico Marx Orchestra (with 17-year-old Mel Tormé as a vocalist). Groucho made several radio appearances during the 1940s and starred in You Bet Your Life, which ran from 1947 to 1961 on NBC radio and television. He authored several books, including Groucho and Me (1959), Memoirs of a Mangy Lover (1964) and The Groucho Letters (1967).

Groucho and Chico briefly appeared in a 1957 color short film promoting The Saturday Evening Post entitled "Showdown at Ulcer Gulch", directed by animator Shamus Culhane, Chico's son-in-law. Groucho, Chico, and Harpo worked together (in separate scenes) in The Story of Mankind (1957). In 1959, the three began production of Deputy Seraph, a TV series starring Harpo and Chico as blundering angels, and Groucho (in every third episode) as their boss, the "Deputy Seraph". The project was abandoned when Chico was found to be uninsurable (and incapable of memorizing his lines) due to severe arteriosclerosis. On March 8 of that year, Chico and Harpo starred as bumbling thieves in The Incredible Jewel Robbery, a half-hour pantomimed episode of the General Electric Theater on CBS. Groucho made a cameo appearance — uncredited, because of constraints in his NBC contract — in the last scene, and delivered the only line of dialogue ("We won't talk until we see our lawyer!").

According to a September 1947 article in Newsweek, Groucho, Harpo, Chico, and Zeppo all signed to appear as themselves in a biopic entitled The Life and Times of the Marx Brothers. In addition to being a non-fiction biography of the Marxes, the film would have featured the brothers re-enacting much of their previously unfilmed material from both their vaudeville and Broadway eras. The film, had it been made, would have been the first performance by the Brothers as a quartet since 1933.

The five brothers made only one television appearance together, in 1957, on an early incarnation of The Tonight Show called Tonight! America After Dark, hosted by Jack Lescoulie. Five years later (October 1, 1962) after Jack Paar's tenure, Groucho made a guest appearance to introduce the Tonight Show's new host, Johnny Carson.

Around 1960, the acclaimed director Billy Wilder considered writing and directing a new Marx Brothers' film. Tentatively titled A Day at the U.N., it was to be a comedy of international intrigue set around the United Nations building in New York. Wilder had discussions with Groucho and Gummo, but the project was put on hold because of Harpo's ill-health, and abandoned when Chico died on October 11, 1961, from arteriosclerosis, when he was 74. Three years later after Chico's death, Harpo died on September 28, 1964, at the age of 75, following a heart attack one day after heart surgery.

In 1966, Filmation produced a pilot for a Marx Brothers' cartoon. Groucho's voice was supplied by Pat Harrington Jr. and other voices were done by Ted Knight and Joe Besser (of The Three Stooges fame).

In 1969, audio excerpts of dialogue from all five of the Marx Brothers' Paramount films were collected and released on an LP album, The Original Voice Tracks from Their Greatest Movies, by Decca Records. The excerpts were interspersed with voice-over introductions by disc jockey and voice actor Gary Owens. The album was praised by Billboard as "a program of zany antics"; the magazine highlighted the excerpts of Groucho, who was "way ahead of his time in spoofing the 'establishment', [and] at his hilarious biting best with his film soundtrack one-line zingers on his love life, his son, politics, big business, society, etc.". Village Voice critic Robert Christgau was less enthusiastic, however, grading the LP a C-plus and recommending it only to fanatics of the comedy group, also expressing displeasure with the interspersing of small portions of "annoying music" and Owens's commentary.
 
In 1970, the four Marx Brothers had a brief reunion of sorts in the animated ABC television special The Mad, Mad, Mad Comedians, produced by Rankin-Bass animation (of Rudolph the Red-Nosed Reindeer fame). The special featured animated re-workings of various famous comedians' acts, including W. C. Fields, Jack Benny, George Burns, Henny Youngman, the Smothers Brothers, Flip Wilson, Phyllis Diller, Jack E. Leonard, George Jessel and the Marx Brothers. Most of the comedians provided their own voices for their animated counterparts, except for Fields and Chico Marx (both of whom had died) and Zeppo Marx (who had left show business in 1933). Voice actor Paul Frees filled in for all three (no voice was needed for Harpo). The Marx Brothers' segment was a re-working of a scene from their Broadway play I'll Say She Is, a parody of Napoleon that Groucho considered among the brothers' funniest routines. The sketch featured animated representations—if not the voices—of all four brothers. Romeo Muller is credited as having written special material for the show, but the script for the classic "Napoleon Scene" was probably supplied by Groucho.

Influence on modern entertainment
On January 16, 1977, the Marx Brothers were inducted into the Motion Picture Hall of Fame. With the deaths of Gummo in April 1977, Groucho in August 1977, and Zeppo in November 1979, the brothers were gone. But their effect on the entertainment community continues well into the 21st century. Among famous comedians who have cited them as influences on their style have been Woody Allen, Alan Alda, Gabe Kaplan, Judd Apatow, Mel Brooks, John Cleese, Elliott Gould, Spike Milligan, Monty Python, Carl Reiner, as well as David Zucker, Jerry Zucker and Jim Abrahams. Comedian Frank Ferrante made impersonations of Groucho a career. Other celebrity fans of the comedy ensemble have been Antonin Artaud, The Beatles, Anthony Burgess, Alice Cooper, Robert Crumb, Salvador Dalí, Eugene Ionesco, George Gershwin (who dressed up as Groucho once), René Goscinny, Cédric Klapisch, J. D. Salinger and Kurt Vonnegut.

Art
Salvador Dalí once made a drawing depicting Harpo.

The epic graphic novel, Cerebus the Aardvark, by Dave Sim, includes a character Lord Julius who is based on Groucho's stage persona.

Film
Peter Sellers imitates Groucho in Let's Go Crazy (1951).

In The Way We Were (1973) the main characters attend a party, dressed as the Marx Brothers. The real Groucho Marx also visited the set, of which a photograph was taken by David F. Smith.

In Woody Allen's Take the Money and Run (1969) Virgil's parents give an interview while wearing Groucho masks. Annie Hall (1977) starts off with a Groucho Marx joke, which is referred to again later. In Manhattan (1979), he names the Marx Brothers as the first thing that makes life worth living. In Stardust Memories there is a huge Groucho poster in the main character's flat. In Allen's film Hannah and Her Sisters (1986), Woody's character, after a suicide attempt, is inspired to go on living after seeing a revival showing of Duck Soup. In Everyone Says I Love You (1996) (the title itself a reference to Groucho's famous song), Woody Allen and Goldie Hawn dress as Groucho for a Marx Brothers celebration in France, and the song "Hooray for Captain Spaulding", from Animal Crackers, is performed, with various actors dressed as the brothers, striking poses famous to Marx fans. (The film itself is named after a song from Horse Feathers, a version of which plays over the opening credits.) In Mighty Aphrodite Woody suggests Harpo and Groucho as names for his son.

In Terry Gilliam's Brazil (1985) a woman in a bathtub is watching The Cocoanuts when troops break into her house. In Twelve Monkeys (1996) the inmates of an insane asylum watch Monkey Business on TV.

In the 1989 film Indiana Jones and the Last Crusade, Professor Henry Jones (Sean Connery) mails his diary to his son Indiana Jones (Harrison Ford) to keep it out of Nazi hands. When Indy misconstrues the purpose of being sent it and returns it to his father instead, his father berates him by saying "I should have mailed it to the Marx Brothers!"

The 1992 film Brain Donors, directed by Dennis Dugan and produced by David Zucker and Jerry Zucker, paid tribute to the Marx Brothers films A Day at the Races and A Night at the Opera. The film starred John Turturro, Mel Smith, and comedian Bob Nelson as loosely imitating Groucho, Chico, and Harpo.

Danny DeVitos Jersey Films planned to make a movie about the early lives of the Marx Brothers.

In Rob Zombie's 2003 film House of 1000 Corpses, the clown Captain Spaulding, as well as many other characters, are named after various Marx brothers characters. In the sequel, The Devil's Rejects, a Marx Brothers expert is brought in to try to help the police get in to the minds of the fugitives who use their character names.

Animation
In the Fleischer Brothers' Betty Boop cartoon Betty in Blunderland (1934) Betty sings Everyone Says I Love You, a song owned by Paramount Pictures, which also owned Betty's cartoons as well as the Marx Brothers film it was taken from: Horse Feathers.

The Marx Brothers have cameos in the Disney cartoons The Bird Store (1932), Mickey's Gala Premier (1932), Mickey's Polo Team (1936), Mother Goose Goes Hollywood (1938) and The Autograph Hound  (1939). Dopey in Snow White and the Seven Dwarfs was inspired by Harpo's mute performances.

Tex Avery's cartoon Hollywood Steps Out (1941) features appearances by Harpo and Groucho. Bugs Bunny impersonated Groucho Marx in the 1947 cartoon Slick Hare (with Elmer Fudd dressing up as Harpo and chasing him with a cleaver), and in Wideo Wabbit (1956) he again impersonated Groucho hosting a TV show called "You Beat Your Wife", asking Elmer Fudd if he had stopped beating his wife.

Many television shows and movies have used Marx Brothers references. Animaniacs and Tiny Toons, for example, have featured Marx Brothers jokes and skits.

The Genie imitates the Marx Brothers in Aladdin and the King of Thieves.

An episode of Histeria! about Communism portrays  Groucho and Chico, respectively, as Karl Marx and Friedrich Engels.

The Marx Brothers, as cartoon characters, appear in the final cartoon released in the Flip The Frog series, in October 1933 as well as other characters such as Buster Keaton, Laurel & Hardy, Mae West, and Jimmy Durante.

Live-action television
Harpo Marx appeared as himself on a 1955 episode of I Love Lucy in which first, he performed "Take Me Out to the Ball Game" on his harp, then, he and Lucille Ball reprised the mirror routine from Duck Soup, with Lucy dressed up as Harpo. Lucy had worked with the Marxes when she appeared in a supporting role in an earlier Marx Brothers film, Room Service. Chico once appeared on I've Got a Secret dressed up as Harpo; his secret was shown in a caption reading, "I'm pretending to be Harpo Marx (I'm Chico)".

Hawkeye Pierce (Alan Alda) on M*A*S*H occasionally put on a fake nose and glasses, and, holding a cigar, did a Groucho impersonation to amuse patients recovering from surgery. Early episodes also featured a singing and off-scene character named Captain Spaulding as a tribute.

In the second episode of The Muppet Show Kermit the Frog sings "Lydia the Tattooed Lady."

In the Airwolf episode "Condemned", four anti-virus formulae for a deadly plague were named after the four Marx Brothers.

In All in the Family, Rob Reiner often did imitations of Groucho, and Sally Struthers dressed as Harpo in one episode in which she (as Gloria Stivic) and Rob (as Mike Stivic) were going to a Marx Brothers film festival, with Reiner dressing as Groucho.

The "Sweathogs" of the ABC-TV series Welcome Back Kotter (John Travolta, Robert Hegyes, Lawrence Hilton-Jacobs, and Ron Palillo) patterned much of their on-camera banter in that series after the Marx Brothers. Series star Gabe Kaplan was reputedly a big Marx Brothers fan, and did many Groucho imitations on the show. Hegyes sometimes imitated both Chico and Harpo.

In an episode of The Mary Tyler Moore Show Murray calls the new station owner at home late at night to complain when the song "Hooray for Captain Spaulding" is cut from a showing of Animal Crackers because of the new owners' policy to cut more and more from shows to sell more ad time, putting his job on the line.

In 1990 three puppets were made of Groucho, Harpo and Chico for the satirical TV show Spitting Image. They were later used to portray the hunters in a 1994 TV production of Peter and the Wolf, with Sting as narrator and puppets from the series as characters.

Theatre
The Marx Brothers' early years were chronicled in the 1970 Broadway musical Minnie's Boys. The show received a brief Off-Broadway revival in 2008.

The Marx Brothers were spoofed in the second act of the 1980 Broadway Review A Day in Hollywood/A Night in the Ukraine.

In the 1996 musical By Jeeves, based on the Jeeves stories by P.G. Wodehouse, during "The Hallo Song", Gussie Fink-Nottle suggests "You're either Pablo Picasso", to which Cyrus Budge III replies "or maybe Harpo Marx!"

In 2010, The Most Ridiculous Thing You Ever Hoid debuted as part of the New York Musical Theatre Festival. The production was based on the Marx Brothers' radio show, Flywheel, Shyster and Flywheel.

Music
Jacques Brel's song "Le Gaz" was inspired by the cabin scene in A Night at the Opera.

Comedy troupe The Firesign Theatre placed an image of Groucho Marx next to one of John Lennon on a banner reading "All Hail Marx Lennon" for the cover of their second comedy record How Can You Be in Two Places at Once When You're Not Anywhere at All (1969).

Rock band Queen named two of their albums after Marx Brothers films; A Night at the Opera (1975) and A Day at the Races (1976), and in Freddie Mercury's solo album Mr. Bad Guy  in the song titled “Living on My Own” he sings; "I ain't got no time for no Monkey Business." In 2002 the band Blind Guardian would also name an album A Night at the Opera.

The 1979  UK top five hit single "Reasons to Be Cheerful, Part 3" by Ian Dury and the Blockheads lists 'Harpo, Groucho, Chico' as reasons to be cheerful.

Groucho Marx can be seen on the cover of Alice Cooper's Greatest Hits by Alice Cooper. English punk band The Damned named their single "There Ain't No Sanity Clause" (1980), in reference to a famous quote from A Night at the Opera. On the 1988 album Modern Lovers '88 by Modern Lovers there is a track called "When Harpo Played His Harp". The band Karl and the Marx Brothers takes their name from them.

Harpo Marx is depicted on the cover of the album Everybody's in Show-Biz by The Kinks in 1972. Early versions of the record showed Groucho, but as he was still alive at the time, he was replaced on later pressings with Harpo, who had died in 1964 and wouldn't require clearance.

The band Sparks had originally been named The Sparks Brothers, as a reference to The Marx Brothers. The recent Edgar Wright documentary The Sparks Brothers retains this title.

Literature
Jack Kerouac wrote a poem To Harpo Marx.

Ron Goulart wrote six books between 1998 and 2005 where Groucho Marx was a detective.

In the 2018 alternate history e-book Hail! Hail! by Harry Turtledove, The Marx Brothers are transported back in time to 1826 and participate in the Fredonian Rebellion.

Advertising
In the Vlasic Pickles commercials, the stork associated with the product holds a pickle the way Groucho held a cigar and, in a Groucho voice, says, "Now that's the best tastin' pickle I ever heard!" and bites into the pickle.

Filmography
Broadway stage:
 I'll Say She Is (1924–1925)
 The Cocoanuts (1925–1926) 
 Animal Crackers (1928–1929)
Films with the four Marx Brothers in New York:
 Humor Risk (1921), made by the Marxes, previewed once and never released; film is lost
 The Cocoanuts (1929), released by Paramount Pictures; based on a 1925 Marx Brothers Broadway musical
 Animal Crackers (1930), released by Paramount; based on a 1928 Marx Brothers Broadway musical

Films with the four Marx Brothers in California:
 The House That Shadows Built (1931), released by Paramount 
 features a sequence, from the opening audition scene of the revue I'll Say She Is, with the Marx Brothers
 Monkey Business (1931), released by Paramount
 Horse Feathers (1932), released by Paramount
 Duck Soup (1933), released by Paramount

Films with the three Marx Brothers (post-Zeppo):
 A Night at the Opera (1935), released by Metro-Goldwyn-Mayer
 A Day at the Races (1937), released by MGM
 Room Service (1938), released by RKO Radio Pictures; based on a 1937 Broadway play that did not star the Marx Brothers
 At the Circus (1939), released by MGM
 Go West (1940), released by MGM
 The Big Store (1941), released by MGM (intended to be their last film)
 A Night in Casablanca (1946), released by United Artists
 Love Happy (1949), released by United Artists
 The Story of Mankind (1957), released by Warner Bros. (not a Marx Brothers film, but the three brothers perform separate cameos)
 The Incredible Jewel Robbery (1959), an episode of the TV series General Electric Theater starring Harpo and Chico with an uncredited Groucho in a cameo role

Solo endeavors:
 Groucho:
 Copacabana (1947), released by United Artists
 Mr. Music (1951), released by Paramount
 Double Dynamite (1951), released by RKO
 A Girl in Every Port (1952), released by RKO
 Will Success Spoil Rock Hunter? (1957), released by 20th Century Fox (uncredited)
 You Bet Your Life (ABC Radio, CBS Radio, NBC-TV 1947–1961)
 The Mikado (1960), made for television
 Tell It To Groucho (CBS-TV 1962)
 Time For Elizabeth (NBC-TV Bob Hope Chrysler Theater special 1964)
 Groucho (ITV London 1965)
 Skidoo (1968), released by Paramount.
 Harpo:
 Too Many Kisses (1925), released by Paramount
 La Fiesta de Santa Barbara (1935) released by MGM
 Stage Door Canteen (1943), released by United Artists (cameo)
 Chico:
 Papa Romani (1950), television pilot
 The College Bowl (ABC-TV 1950–1951)
 Zeppo:
 A Kiss in the Dark (1925), released by Paramount (cameo)

Characters

Legacy

Awards and honors
In the 1974 Academy Awards telecast, Jack Lemmon presented Groucho with an honorary Academy Award to a standing ovation. The award was also on behalf of Harpo, Chico, and Zeppo, whom Lemmon mentioned by name. It was one of Groucho's final major public appearances.  "I wish that Harpo and Chico could be here to share with me this great honor", he said, naming the two deceased brothers (Zeppo was still alive at the time and in the audience). Groucho also praised the late Margaret Dumont as a great straight woman who never understood any of his jokes.

The Marx Brothers were collectively named No. 20 on AFI's list of the Top 25 American male screen legends of Classic Hollywood. They are the only group to be so honored.

See also
 Margaret Dumont, an actress frequently double-acting with the Marx Brothers, especially Groucho
 Thelma Todd, another actress frequently appearing alongside the Marx Brothers

References

Further reading

Memoir
 Marx, Groucho, Beds (1930) Farrar & Rinehart, (1976) Bobbs-Merrill
 Marx, Groucho, Many Happy Returns (1942) Simon & Schuster
 Marx, Arthur, Life with Groucho (1954) Simon & Schuster, (revised as My Life with Groucho: A Son's Eye View, 1988) 
 Marx, Groucho, Groucho and Me (1959) Random House, (1989) Fireside Books 
 Marx, Harpo (with Barber, Rowland), Harpo Speaks! (1961) Bernard Geis Associates, (1985) Limelight Editions 
 Marx, Groucho, Memoirs of a Mangy Lover (1963) Bernard Geis Associates, (2002) Da Capo Press 
 Marx, Groucho, The Groucho Letters: Letters from and to Groucho Marx (1967, 2007) Simon & Schuster 
 Marx, Arthur, Son of Groucho (1972) David McKay Co. 
 Marx, Groucho, The Groucho Phile (1976) Bobbs-Merrill Co.
 Marx, Groucho (with Arce, Hector), The Secret Word Is GROUCHO (1976) G.P. Putnam's Sons
 Marx, Maxine, Growing Up with Chico (1980) Prentice-Hall, (1984) Simon & Schuster
 Allen, Miriam Marx, Love, Groucho: Letters from Groucho Marx to His Daughter Miriam (1992) Faber & Faber 
Biography
 Crichton, Kyle, The Marx Brothers (1950) Doubleday & Co.
 Zimmerman, Paul D., The Marx Brothers at the Movies (1968) G.P. Putnam's Sons
 Eyles, Allen, The Marx Brothers: Their World of Comedy (1969) A.S. Barnes
 Robinson, David, The Great Funnies: A History of Film Comedy (1969) E.P. Dutton
 Durgnat, Raymond, "Four Against Alienation" from The Crazy Mirror: Hollywood Comedy and the American Image (1970) Dell
 Maltin, Leonard, Movie Comedy Teams (1970, revised 1985) New American Library
 Anobile, Richard J. (ed.), Why a Duck?: Visual and Verbal Gems from the Marx Brothers Movies (1971) Avon Books
 Bergman, Andrew, "Some Anarcho-Nihilist Laff Riots" from We're in the Money: Depression America and Its Films (1971) New York University Press
 Adamson, Joe, Groucho, Harpo, Chico and Sometimes Zeppo (1973, 1983) Simon & Schuster
 Kalmar, Bert, and Perelman, S. J., The Four Marx Brothers in Monkey Business and Duck Soup (Classic Film Scripts) (1973) Simon & Schuster
 Mast, Gerald, The Comic Mind: Comedy and the Movies (1973, 2nd ed. 1979) University of Chicago Press
 McCaffrey, Donald W., "Zanies in a Stage-Movieland" from The Golden Age of Sound Comedy (1973) A. S. Barnes
 Anobile, Richard J. (ed.), Hooray for Captain Spaulding!: Verbal and Visual Gems from Animal Crackers (1974) Avon Books
 Anobile, Richard J., The Marx Bros. Scrapbook (1974) Grosset & Dunlap, (1975) Warner Books
 Wolf, William, The Marx Brothers (1975) Pyramid Library
 Byron, Stuart and Weis, Elizabeth (eds.), The National Society of Film Critics on Movie Comedy (1977) Grossman/Viking
 Maltin, Leonard, The Great Movie Comedians (1978) Crown Publishers
 Arce, Hector, Groucho (1979) G. P. Putnam's Sons
 Chandler, Charlotte, Hello, I Must Be Going: Groucho & His Friends (1978) Doubleday & Co., (2007) Simon & Schuster 
 Weales, Gerald, Canned Goods as Caviar: American Film Comedy of the 1930s (1985) University of Chicago Press
 Gehring, Wes D., The Marx Brothers: A Bio-Bibliography (1987) Greenwood Press
 Barson, Michael (ed.), Flywheel, Shyster and Flywheel: The Marx Brothers Lost Radio Show (1988) Pantheon Books
 Eyles, Allen, The Complete Films of the Marx Brothers (1992) Carol Publishing Group
 Gehring, Wes D., Groucho and W.C. Fields: Huckster Comedians (1994) University Press of Mississippi
 Mitchell, Glenn, The Marx Brothers Encyclopedia (1996) B.T. Batsford Ltd., (revised 2003) Reynolds & Hearn
 Stoliar, Steve, Raised Eyebrows: My Years Inside Groucho's House (1996) General Publishing Group 
 Dwan, Robert, As Long As They're Laughing!: Groucho Marx and You Bet Your Life (2000) Midnight Marquee Press, Inc.
 Kanfer, Stefan, Groucho: The Life and Times of Julius Henry Marx (2000) Alfred A. Knopf 
 Bego, Mark, The Marx Brothers (2001) Pocket Essentials
 Louvish, Simon, Monkey Business: The Lives and Legends of the Marx Brothers (2001) Thomas Dunne Books 
 Gehring, Wes D., Film Clowns of the Depression (2007) McFarland & Co.
 Keesey, Douglas, with Duncan, Paul (ed.), Marx Bros. (2007) Movie Icons series, Taschen

External links

 Stars of Bedlam: The Rise & Fall of the Marx Brothers (Part 1...11) July 2022
 Frank M. Bland. Marx Brothers resource - whyaduck
 Robert B. Weide. The Marx Brothers In A Nutshell
 Robert S. Bader. 2016. The Marx Brothers: From Vaudeville to Hollywood - marxbrothers.net

 

American comedy troupes
American male comedy actors
American people of German-Jewish descent
American surrealist artists
Jewish American comedians
Jewish-American families
Jewish male comedians
Metro-Goldwyn-Mayer contract players
Paramount Pictures contract players
People from Yorkville, Manhattan
Sibling performing groups
Sibling quartets
Surreal comedy films
Vaudeville performers